The 2014–15 First Women's Basketball League of Serbia is the 9th season of the First Women's Basketball League of Serbia, the highest professional basketball league in Serbia. It is also 71st national championship played by Serbian clubs inclusive of nation's previous incarnations as Yugoslavia and Serbia & Montenegro.

The first half of the season consists of 12 teams and 132-game regular season (22 games for each of the 12 teams).

Team information

Regular season
The League of the season was played with 14 teams and play a dual circuit system, each with each one game at home and away. The four best teams at the end of the regular season were placed in the Play Off. The regular season began on 11 October 2014 and it will end on 2 March 2015.

Play Off
Play Off is played according to the cup system. Champion is received after the final was played. In the semifinals was played on 2 wins, in the Final at 3 wins. Play Off is played from 18. March 2015. to 15. April 2015.

Semifinals
Game 1

Game 2

Final

Game 2

Game 3

Game 4

Bracket

Awards
Finals MVP: Kristina Topuzović (183-F/G-94) of Radivoj Korać
Player of the Year: Jelena Vučetić (178-G-93) of Vojvodina
Point Guard of the Year: Jelena Vučetić (178-G-93) of Vojvodina
Power Forward of the Year: Kristina Topuzović (183-F/G-94) of Radivoj Korać
Center of the Year: Ivana Brajković (195-C-93) of Radivoj Korać
Coach of the Year: Miloš Pavlović of Radivoj Korać

1st Team
G: Jelena Vučetić (178-G-93) of Vojvodina
G: Tamara Kapor (184-G-91) of Radivoj Korać
F/G: Jovana Jakšić (178-F/G-92) of Radivoj Korać
F/G: Kristina Topuzović (183-F/G-94) of Radivoj Korać
C: Ivana Brajković (195-C-93) of Radivoj Korać

2nd Team
PG: Aleksandra Katanić (172-PG-97) of Crvena zvezda
G: Jelena Ćulafić (172-G-89) of Šumadija Kragujevac
SG: Sanja Mandić (178-SG-95) of Radivoj Korać
F: Jovana Pasić (180-F-92) of Vojvodina
F/C: Kristina Raković (186-F/C-94) of Šumadija Kragujevac

3rd Team
G: Rada Vidović (177-G-79) of Spartak Subotica
G: Marija Prlja (163-G-87) of SBS Ostrava
F: Bojana Janković (184-F-83) of Partizan
F/C: Nataša Mijatović (191-F/C-89) of Šumadija Kragujevac
C: Milica Cvetanović (195-C-86) of Radnički Kragujevac

Honorable Mention
Vida Emeše (188-F/C-93) of Vojvodina
Milena Laković (93) of Vojvodina
Marina Mandić (182-F-83) of Vršac
Branka Luković (190-PF-95) of Partizan
Kristina Milošević (177-F-90) of Šumadija Kragujevac
Tijana Čukić (173-PG-96) of Vrbas Medela
Miljana Džombeta (169-PG-94) of Čelik Zenica
Žaklina Janković (190-C/F-94) of Vršac
Mina Đorđevic (186-PF-99) of Crvena zvezda
Aleksandra Katanić (172-PG-97) of Crvena zvezda
Bojana Stevanović (180-PF-96) of Radnički Kragujevac
Mirjana Velisavljević (188-C-78) of Šabac
Anđelina Radić (187-F-94) of Vojvodina

References

External links
First Women's Basketball League of Serbia at eurobasket.com
First Women's Basketball League of Serbia at srbijasport.net

First Women's Basketball League of Serbia seasons
Serbia
women